Keitaro Hoshino (14 August 1969 – 9 October 2021) was a Japanese boxer.

Professional career 
Hoshino turned pro in 1988 and captured the WBA minimumweight title with a decision win over Joma Gamboa in 2000. He defended the belt once before losing it by split decision to Chana Porpaoin in 2001. He recaptured the vacant WBA minimumweight title with a decision win over Gamboa in 2002, but lost the belt in his first defense to Noel Arambulet.

See also 
List of WBA world champions
List of Japanese boxing world champions
Boxing in Japan

References

External links 
 

1969 births
2021 deaths
Mini-flyweight boxers
World mini-flyweight boxing champions
World Boxing Association champions
Sportspeople from Yokohama
Japanese male boxers